The twenty-fifth Senate district of Connecticut elects one member of the Connecticut Senate. The district consists of all of Norwalk and part of Darien. Its current Senator is Democrat Bob Duff.

List of representatives
Prior to 1905, the area in the 25th district was represented by the 12th District.

Recent Election Results

2022

2020

2018

External links 
 Connecticut Senate district map

References

25
25th